The University of Georgia Small Satellite Research Laboratory (SSRL), or UGA SSRL, is a research laboratory founded in late 2015 with the goal of launching a student-built spacecraft into low Earth orbit. The SSRL is currently building the University of Georgia's first two satellites. The lab has a Space Act Agreement with the NASA Ames Research Center.

Founding
At its inception in late 2015, the three undergraduate founders of the Small Satellite Research Laboratory envisioned it as a space company. Two of the founders had been involved in a previous startup as part of a UGA accelerator program. Their product, a large, remote-operated, 3D-printed telescope, achieved moderate success, but was overshadowed by the work which ultimately became the foundation of the SSRL. After winning the Virginia Tech Hacks Hackathon, they left the previous startup company. The founding trio initially planned to build a small satellite crowdfunded on Kickstarter, but as the project developed, rapid increases in scope and complexity drove the founders to seek more people and new sources of funding. Currently, the lab works with NASA and the  Air Force Research Laboratory to construct two 3U CubeSats to be deployed into low Earth orbit. The SSRL now consists of over 50 members, and marks the first attempt at a space program at the  University of Georgia. The SSRL has stated that it plans to become the university's premier space program, and to establish the school's continual presence in space. This will make the University of Georgia one of the first institutions in the state of Georgia to send a complete satellite into space.

Cube Satellites

The Spectral Ocean Color (SPOC) Satellite

The Spectral Ocean Color Satellite, known as the SPOC satellite, a 3U CubeSat, was the University of Georgia's first satellite mission. SPOC was launched to the International Space Station on October 2, 2020 from NASA Wallops Flight Facility onboard the Cygnus NG-14 commercial resupply spacecraft. On November 5, 2020, SPOC was deployed from the International Space Station via the Nanoracks CubeSat Deployer, where it officially began its mission.

The SPOC satellite was selected in by the NASA's Undergraduate Student Instrument Project and NASA's eight CubeSat Launch Initiative to be built in 2016-2018 and launched in 2018, 2019, or 2020.

The primary objective of the SPOC Satellite mission was to perform the first moderate resolution multispectral analysis of the following phenomena off the Georgia coast from low earth orbit: vegetation heath, primary productivity, ocean productivity, near-coastal sediment, organic matter, and mapping the production of shelf waters and salt marshes. The SSRL also sought to build a unique Georgia coastal imagery library that aggregates and classifies all gathered data from SPOC. Data from the SPOC mission will supplement the Georgia Coastal Ecosystems Long Term Ecological Research Program's data with data of Sapelo Island from orbit. The data sets generated by the SPOC satellite will be comparable to NASA's MODIS sensor on the Terra satellite from the spectral ranges of 450nm - 900nm.

The Multi-view Onboard Computational Imager (MOCI) Satellite

The Multi-view Onboard Computational Imager Satellite, known as the MOCI satellite, is a 6U CubeSat that will be the University of Georgia's second satellite. The MOCI satellite was selected in the ninth iteration of the University Nanosatellite Program, UNP-9. The primary mission of the MOCI satellite will be to perform structure from motion (SfM) in Low Earth Orbit (LEO) and generate 3D point clouds on a landscape scale to generate Digital Elevation Models. This will be the first time a CubeSat has specialized in building 3D models using structure from motion. MOCI will employ customize algorithms for feature extraction, structure from motion, surface reconstruction, data compression, and oceanic anomaly detection.

References

University of Georgia
Organizations established in 2016
University of Georgia campus